Fireside may refer to:
 The area near a domestic fireplace or a fire ring
 Fireside (LDS Church), an evening meeting in The Church of Jesus Christ of Latter-day Saints (Mormons)
 Fireside (apple), an apple cultivar
 Fireside (band), Swedish rock band

Places
 Fireside, British Columbia, a community in Canada
 Fireside, Ohio, a community in the United States

See also 
 Fireside poets, group of 19th-century U.S. poets from New England
 Fireside Books, publishing imprint of Simon & Schuster
 The Fireside Bowl, concert venue in Chicago, Illinois
 Fireside chats, evening radio talks given by U.S. President F. D. Roosevelt 
 Fireside Favourites (1980), album by Fad Gadget
 The Fireside Girls, a group of female protagonists in the TV cartoon Phineas and Ferb
 Fireside Theatre (1949–1958), U.S. TV anthology drama series on NBC
 By the Fireside, pseudonym for UK musical artist Daniel Lea
 Marvel Fireside Books (1974–1979), series of Marvel comics reprinted by Fireside Books
 Farm & Fireside  (1878–1939), American magazine that became Country Home